Astranis Space Technologies Corp., doing business as Astranis, is a private American geostationary communications satellite operator and manufacturer headquartered in San Francisco, California. It was founded by chief executive officer John Gedmark and Chief Technical Officer Ryan McLinko.

In 2018, Astranis launched DemoSat-2, a prototype 3U cubesat to test the company's Software-Defined Radio (SDR) technology for its larger communications satellites.

Astranis came out of stealth mode with their March 2018 announcement of a $13.5 million fundraising round to support their development of smaller geostationary communications satellites led by Andreessen Horowitz., marking the firm's first investment in a space company.

In January 2019, Astranis announced their first commercial program, a partnership with Pacific Dataport, Inc. to triple the satellite internet capacity of Alaska. The satellite is scheduled to begin service in 2021, and is estimated to be 350 kg, roughly an order of magnitude smaller than existing geostationary satellites.

Astranis has raised over $350 million in venture capital and venture debt financing from Andreessen Horowitz, Venrock, BlackRock, and other investors. The company was part of the Winter 2016 cohort of the Y Combinator accelerator.

Demonstration Satellite 

On January 12, 2018, Astranis flew its first satellite, “DemoSat 2,” on an Indian PSLV-XL rocket. DemoSat 2 was a 3U cubesat (10 cm x 10 cm x 30 cm; less than 3 kg) that held an Astranis-built Software-Defined Radio (SDR) as its primary payload.

Partnership with Pacific Dataport 

Astranis announced a partnership with Pacific Dataport, Inc., a subsidiary of Microcom, Alaska's largest satellite TV provider, on January 16, 2019. The mission of this partnership is to launch a geostationary communications satellite dedicated to Alaska. Astranis will launch this first satellite, named Arcturus, via SpaceX's Falcon Heavy rocket with a launch window beginning in early 2022.

Funding 

Astranis has raised over $350 million in venture financing. They closed an $13.5 million Series A equity investment led by Andreessen Horowitz on March 1, 2018, and a $90 million Series B investment on February 13, 2020 led by Venrock and with continued participation from Andreessen Horowitz. The Series B financing included $40 million of equity financing and $50 million of debt financing. Astranis also raised a $250 million Series C financing round led by BlackRock in 2021. Astranis was part of the Winter 2016 cohort of the Y Combinator accelerator.

References 

Space
Communications satellite operators